Amolops lifanensis (common names: Lifan sucker frog, Lifan torrent frog) is a species of frog in the family Ranidae that is endemic to central Sichuan, China. It is a common species within its small range, living in and along streams in forests. It is locally threatened by dam construction.

References

lifanensis
Amphibians described in 1945
Amphibians of China
Endemic fauna of Sichuan
Taxonomy articles created by Polbot